Since its opening in 1908, the Royal Canadian Mint has produced coinage and planchets for over 73 countries. This list of foreign countries with coinage struck at the Royal Canadian Mint lists countries that have been serviced by the Crown corporation, as listed on the website of the Canadian Numismatic Publishing Institute.

  Algeria
  Argentina
  Australia - Most recently produced was 1981 20c coin
  Bahamas
  Bangladesh
  Barbados - As recently as 2004-2005
  Bermuda
  Bolivia
  Botswana
  Brazil
  Cayman Islands
  China
  Colombia
  Costa Rica
  Cuba
  Cyprus
  Czech Republic
  Dominica
  Dominican Republic
  Ecuador
  El Salvador
  Ethiopia
  Fiji
  Ghana
  Guatemala

  Haiti
  Honduras
  Hong Kong
  Iceland
  India
  Indonesia
  Iran
  Iraq
  Isle of Man
  Israel
  Italy
  Jamaica
  Jordan
  Lebanon
  Macau
  Madagascar
  Malawi
  Malaysia
  Mexico
  Nepal
  Netherlands Antilles
  New Zealand
  Dominion of Newfoundland (Prior to joining the Canadian Confederation)
  Nicaragua
  Norway

  Oman
  Panama
  Papua New Guinea
  Philippines
  Portugal
  Singapore
  Slovakia
  Spain
  Sri Lanka
  Syria
  Taiwan (Republic of China)
  Tanzania
  Thailand
  Trinidad and Tobago
  Tunisia
  Turks & Caicos
  Uganda
  Ukraine
  United Arab Emirates
  United Kingdom
  Venezuela
  Yemen
  Zambia

Early history of RCM foreign circulation

In 1970, Master of the Mint, Gordon Ward Hunter relaunched the Foreign Circulation division. In January 1970, the RCM won a contract for Singapore to produce six million rimmed blanks in a copper nickel alloy. This was their first export contract since a contract for the Dominican Republic 32 years earlier. The second contract came in April 1970 with the Central Bank of Brazil. The RCM produced 84 million blanks for the 50 centavo piece. In August 1971, the People's Democratic Republic of Yemen placed an order for 2 million five fil pieces. This was followed by an order from Iceland for 2.5 million one crown pieces.

In October 1971, the Bank of Jamaica asked the RCM to produce a commemorative ten dollar coin in sterling silver, and a twenty dollar gold coin of proof quality. Also in 1971, the RCM made coins for the Bahamas, Bermuda, Cayman Islands, and the Isle of Man. An order for 100 million general circulation five centime and ten centimo coins for Venezuela was received as well. By 1973, orders totaled sixty five million coins, and seventy million blanks. By 1974, the Ottawa facility produced a total of 1.2 billion coins (foreign and domestic), a facility record.

References

Royal Canadian Mint, List of foreign countries
Canada, Foreign, List of
Foreign countries with coinage struck at the Royal Canadian Mint
Foreign countries with coinage struck at the Royal Canadian Mint